The 2003 Purdue Boilermakers football team represented Purdue University in the 2003 NCAA Division I-A football season.  The team was coached by Joe Tiller and played its home games at Ross–Ade Stadium.  Purdue played thirteen games in the 2003 season, finishing with a 9–4 record and a loss in the Capital One Bowl to Georgia.

Schedule

Roster

Game summaries

Bowling Green State

A Purdue Boilermaker football team loaded with experience (8 senior starters on defense) entered 2003 with high expectations (#18 preseason ranking), but they suffered a stunning opening day 27-26 upset loss to the MAC's Bowling Green Falcons.

After Purdue took the season's opening drive for a touchdown (a jump-ball touchdown catch by 6' 9" freshman WR Kyle Ingraham), Bowling Green QB Josh Harris responded with outstanding clutch play, throwing for 350 yards and 3 touchdowns in the see-saw contest.  Midway through the 4th quarter with Purdue leading 24–20, the Boilermaker offense could not take advantage of a DE Shaun Phillips interception.  With under 3 minutes remaining, Harris drove the Falcons down the field to a 4th and 14 situation at the Purdue 32-yard line.  In a play eerily similar to the 2002 "Holy Buckeye" play, Harris evaded a heavy rush to deliver a deep pass to WR Charles Sharon, who outfought 2 Purdue defenders to make the winning touchdown catch.

Purdue WR Taylor Stubblefield had 16 catches for 139 yards and caught his first-ever regular season touchdown in defeat, but had an unfortunate drop on the final drive that could have set up a game-tying FG attempt.  Falcons WR Cole Magner ran out the last 8 seconds of the game clock by taking an intentional safety, bringing the score to its final tally.

Bowling Green would go on to have one of the best football seasons in program history, finishing 11–3 with a Motor City Bowl win over Northwestern.  Purdue would emerge from this loss with a new determination that would bring success in the weeks ahead...

Wake Forest

Purdue rebounded from their opening day loss with a close win at #20 Wake Forest – which was ranked for the first time in 16 years after starting the season with two wins over ranked opponents.

Late in the close game with Purdue clinging to a 16–10 lead, the Deacons created an opportunity for victory by forcing a turnover on a punt return by Anthony Chambers.  But the Purdue defense stopped Wake Forest on a 4th down running play thanks to a well-timed run blitz by All-American free safety Stuart Schweigert, who made a game-clinching tackle for loss.  "Stu" earlier had set up a FG with an interception and long return on the game's first play from scrimmage.

Purdue kicker Ben Jones, a recent transfer from Butler University, made three important FGs that helped provide the final margin.

Arizona

After the Boilermakers had worn primarily gold uniforms at home in 2002, the Boilermakers were "Back in Black" for the first of a four-game homestand that began with the struggling Arizona Wildcats of the Pac-10.  The Boilermakers dominated Arizona by a then-Ross–Ade Stadium record margin of 59–7. The offense outgained Arizona 580–174 in yards, achieving near perfect balance with 288 rushing and 292 passing.  Redshirt freshman RB Jerome Brooks paced Purdue with 122 yards on the ground, and the Purdue defense sacked Arizona QBs 5 times; fifth-year senior LB Landon Johnson recovered a fumble and had an interception.

Notre Dame

The Boilermakers improved to 3–1 and returned to the Top 25 with a win over their in-state rival Notre Dame.  Purdue's senior-led defense continually pressured freshman QB Brady Quinn in his first college start with many knockdowns, and intercepted him 4 times (FS Stuart Schweigert had 2 picks).  Still, Quinn managed to throw for 297 yards, but the Boilermaker defense made the Irish offense one-dimensional by limiting Julius Jones and the Irish running game to under 50 yards.  The Irish defense played very well in defeat, holding Purdue to 223 yards of offense, but they could not force any Purdue turnovers.

The Boilermakers struck on their first drive with QB Kyle Orton's 36-yard touchdown pass to Ray Williams on a missed coverage assignment, then they turned LB Niko Koutouvides' interception into a FG for a 10–0 first quarter lead.  The Irish pulled to 13–10 before the half on WR Maurice Stovall's 85-yard touchdown catch.

But the Irish did not score again.  Quinn's third interception early in the 4th quarter was turned into a goal-line touchdown pass from Orton to DE Shaun Phillips, who lined up at TE on the play to provide the final 23–10 margin.  It was Phillips' second career touchdown catch, duplicating his feat vs. Minnesota in 2002.

WR John Standeford became Purdue's all-time leader in receptions with 2 catches on the early touchdown drive.  The record was short-lived however, as his teammate WR Taylor Stubblefield would shatter this mark in 2004.

Illinois

Purdue jumped all over their Homecoming opponent Illinois early and often in a 43–10 win in their Big Ten opener, bringing them to a 4–1 mark.  The Boilermakers scored touchdowns on 4 of their first 5 drives to take a 27–0 lead by early in the 2nd quarter.  Terrific protection by Nick Hardwick and the rest of the offensive line helped sophomore RB Jerod Void gain 119 yards rushing and 4 touchdowns. RB Jerome Brooks added 82 yards on the ground to help Purdue amass 300+ Team rushing yards.

Purdue's veteran defense shined once again, limiting QB Jon Beutjer and the Illinois offense to 191 total yards and no touchdowns.  The lone Fighting Illini touchdown came on a punt return by RB E.B. Halsey.

Penn State

Purdue improved to 5–1 with another solid defensive effort and a few terrific punt returns from Anthony Chambers, who returned one for a touchdown and set up 2 other touchdowns with long returns.

Penn State sophomore quarterback Michael Robinson, filling in for injured QB Zach Mills, had a difficult day (10–32; 98 yards, 2 interceptions) at the hands of the Purdue defense, who limited PSU to 204 total yards.  After Chambers' punt return touchdown made the score 17-7, Purdue's late first half drive was thwarted by CB Alan Zemaitis' 90-yard interception return, which set up a short Robinson touchdown pass to Isaac Smolko to cut Purdue's lead to 3.  But the Nittany Lions would not score again.

Starting RB Jerod Void was injured on his first run of the day on a tackle from LB Gino Capone.  But Sophomore RB Brandon Jones was terrific in relief, physically pounding the young PSU defense with 149 yards on 29 carries, and scoring 2 goal-line touchdowns.  Kicker Ben Jones missed his first FG of the season, but made his other 2 attempts, improving his early season tally to 9 FGs in 10 attempts.

Wisconsin

In a Big Ten classic hosted by ESPN College Football Gameday, the Boilermakers became bowl-eligible for the seventh year in a row under Joe Tiller by prevailing over #14 Wisconsin, which had ended Ohio State's 19-game winning streak the previous week.

Though the Boilermakers played conservatively on offense most of 2003, this game was an exception as Purdue's offense went with a Drew Brees-era style by featuring the passing game.  QB Kyle Orton completed his first 15 passes to masterfully engineer touchdown drives on Purdue's first 2 possessions for a 14–0 lead.  But Wisconsin rallied with an Anthony Davis touchdown run and LB Jeff Mack's fumble return for touchdown to close the margin to 14–13 early in the second quarter (the Badgers missed an extra point).  The Badgers kept Purdue out of the end zone the rest of the game, but Purdue did add 3 field goals to produce a 23–16 lead.  With less than 3 minutes left, Wisconsin safety Jim Leonhard made a spectacular punt return touchdown to tie the game.  But that's when Orton guided the Purdue offense on a winning drive, setting up a Ben Jones FG with 3 seconds left.  Orton converted 2 3rd down and long passes on the drive, and then completed a deep pass to WR Ray Williams to set up the winning kick.

In defeat, Wisconsin LB Alex Lewis recorded an amazing 5 sacks and forced the fumble that Mack returned for a touchdown.  In victory, the Purdue defense continued its terrific 2003 season by sacking Badger QBs 9 times (Shaun Phillips had 4.5), yielding only 12 first downs and less than 300 yards of offense, and forcing 2 turnovers (including an interception by senior CB Jacques Reeves on Wisconsin's first play).

Kyle Orton completed his first 15 passes on the way to a 38–55; 411 yard performance.  Senior WR John Standeford and junior WR Taylor Stubblefield combined to catch 30 passes for 314 yards.  It was Stubblefield's second 16-catch performance of the season.

Michigan

Purdue's 6 game winning streak came to a decisive end in Ann Arbor, dropping to 6–2 against the supremely talented and eventual Big Ten champion #13 Michigan Wolverines.  From start to finish, the Purdue offense was bullied, harassed and roughed-up by an ultra-aggressive Michigan defense that employed numerous blitzing schemes (7 sacks) and press "bump and run" coverage to limit the Boilermakers to only 242 yards of offense.

Despite being dominated, Purdue had a chance to seize momentum late in the first half when the Boilers recovered a fumble from a Shaun Phillips sack of Michigan QB John Navarre.  QB Kyle Orton quickly moved the Purdue offense to a first and goal, but then threw an end zone interception to CB Leon Hall, the first of 2 picks for the freshman playing for an injured Marlin Jackson.

The Michigan offense had a solid (but not dominant) day against the stout Purdue defense, as senior RB Chris Perry grinded out 95 yards on 28 carries.  The terrific trio of Michigan WRs (Braylon Edwards, Jason Avant and Steve Breaston) each made valuable contributions.  Avant had 5 catches for 90 yards, Breaston took an end-around 21 yards for a score, and Edwards had 6 catches for 86 yards and 2 scores, including a highlight-reel third-quarter touchdown catch over CB Jacques Reeves that put the game out of reach.

Purdue coach Joe Tiller praised the Michigan receiving corps before and after the game as "the best...(he had) ever seen."  He was impressed with what he referred to as the "creatures" on the Wolverine defense.

Northwestern

The Boilermakers returned home and to their winning formula of ball control running, play-action passing and turnover-producing defense to bounce back from the nightmare in Ann Arbor, defeating the solid Northwestern Wildcats 34-14 to improve to 7-2 and stay in the hunt for a share of the Big Ten title.

The Wildcats had excelled at ball security with an NCAA-low 2 lost fumbles, but they came apart against the Purdue defense by losing 4 fumbles.  Two of these were turned into first quarter touchdowns by the Boilermaker offense, led by an efficient Kyle Orton (14-24; 212 yards, 1 rushing touchdown).  Late in the 3rd quarter, after the Purdue defense had stopped Northwestern on a goal line stand, the Boilermakers embarked on a 98-yard touchdown drive that ended with RB Jerod Void's 2nd touchdown run to effectively put the game away.

Senior WR John Standeford set the Big Ten career receiving yards record in this game, getting a brief ovation after a 31 yard catch in the 4th quarter.

Iowa

On a Senior Day clash with a defense every bit as strong as their own, #14 Purdue scored a surprisingly decisive 27–14 win over #10 Iowa to improve to 8–2 – Purdue's best record this late into the season since 1979.  Boilermaker sophomore RB Jerod Void had his best game of the season to date with 34 carries for 120 yards and 2 touchdowns against the NCAA top 10 ranked Iowa run defense.

For the 8th time in 10 games, the Boilers took their opening drive for a score, as Void took advantage of terrific blocking by his offensive line and junior FB Jon Goldsberry for 22 and 9-yard runs, the latter going for a touchdown.  Purdue then added 2 field goals before halftime, while Iowa miscues kept them scoreless.  On two different occasions Iowa QB Nathan Chandler missed open receivers for touchdowns. On another drive a Chandler touchdown pass to WR Mo Brown was called back by penalty, and then the Hawkeyes came up empty when kicker Nate Kaeding missed his first FG of the year.

On the opening drive of the 2nd half, Purdue started with a kickoff return to midfield, and then converted a 3rd and 5 situation with QB Kyle Orton's 45-yard touchdown pass to WR Anthony Chambers for a 20–0 lead.  On the Boilers' next possession, Orton's efficient passing and nifty bootleg runs set up Void's second touchdown for a 27–0 advantage with 7:30 left in the 3rd quarter.  After Iowa drove for touchdowns on their next 2 possessions to narrow the score to 27–14 with 9:56 left in the game, Orton directed the Purdue offense on a ball-control 8 minute drive that featured numerous 3rd down conversions to bring the clock down to 2:09 to go, but Purdue came up empty when kicker Ben Jones missed a FG attempt.  The Iowa offense then made the game interesting by moving into scoring position on a couple of brilliant Mo Brown receptions.  But Purdue free safety Stuart Schweigert – playing in his last home game – put an end to the Hawkeye rally with an end zone interception.

Notwithstanding the late rally, Purdue's defense had another fine performance, as it held terrific Iowa RB Fred Russell to 35 yards rushing on 18 carries, and sacked Chandler 4 times.

Ohio State

For the second time this year, ESPN College Gameday visited a contest involving Purdue, and with a chance to qualify for a share of the Big Ten title or an at-large BCS bowl game, the Boilermakers suffered a heartbreaking loss for the 2nd straight year to the #4 Ohio State Buckeyes, falling 16–13 to the Buckeyes in overtime.

As expected, the defenses largely controlled the game by keeping it low in points and high in punts.  Purdue took its opening offensive drive 53 yards before settling for a Ben Jones FG.  Late in the first quarter, the Buckeyes struck on a 58-yard pass from QB Craig Krenzel to WR Michael Jenkins to set up a 1st and goal.  A controversial pass interference no-call resulted in a short FG for Buckeyes' all-time great kicker Mike Nugent to tie the game at 3.  Purdue RB Jerod Void returned the ensuing kickoff near midfield, resulting in a short drive that ended with a long Jones FG to put Purdue back up 6–3.  The Buckeyes slowly gained an edge in field position for the rest of the half, as they turned a short drive into a 52-yard Nugent FG to send the teams into the locker room tied at 6.

The game remained a field position battle for the better part of the 2nd half, as neither team's offense turned the ball over or scored any points.  However, Purdue came up empty on an 86-yard drive when Ben Jones' FG attempt missed badly wide left.

Early in the 4th quarter Purdue faced a 3rd and long deep in their own territory.  OSU defensive linemen Will Smith and Tim Anderson converged on QB Kyle Orton, forcing a fumble that DE Mike Kudla recovered for a touchdown that gave OSU a 13–6 lead.  After a punt exchange, Purdue started a drive from their own 8-yard line with 6:36 to go and quickly faced another 3rd down and long yardage situation.  Starting with a third down conversion pass to Anthony Chambers, Orton moved the Purdue offense over the next 5 plays to the OSU 11-yard line and then capped the impressive game-tying 92-yard drive with a well-executed Statue of Liberty touchdown run by RB Jerod Void.

After the Buckeyes' next drive ended just outside FG range, the OSU punt by B. J. Sander pinned Purdue inside their own 20-yard line for the seventh time in the game.  With under 2 minutes left, the Boilermakers moved the ball to their 32-yard line, but then Orton mishandled the QB snap, resulting in a fumble that the Buckeyes recovered.  OSU proceeded to run the clock down to 4 seconds on three running plays to set up Nugent's winning FG attempt.  However, on the last play of regulation reserve LB Bobby Iwuchukwu (playing for the injured Gilbert Gardner) blocked the FG, keeping Purdue alive and sending the game to Overtime.

On Ohio State's overtime possession, the offense could not get a first down, but Nugent kicked a FG (partially blocked again by Iwuchukwu) to put the Buckeyes ahead 16–13.  Needing a FG to tie or touchdown to win, Purdue gained a first down on an amazing effort by WR Taylor Stubblefield but could not advance further, bringing in Jones for a game-tying FG attempt.  Unfortunately for Purdue, Jones missed the FG wide left, ending the game.

In defeat, Niko Koutouvides led the defense with 15 tackles and two pass defended.

Indiana

    
    
    
    
    
    
    
    

Purdue finished a highly successful regular season at 9–3 to qualify for a New Year's Day bowl, but it was not without struggle against the lowly 2–10 Indiana Hoosiers.  The Boilermakers made some uncharacteristic mistakes that turned a comfortable margin into a 5-point game, but then held on to get the 24–16 win.

Two of Purdue's senior stars – WR John Standeford (6-151, 2 touchdowns) and LB Landon Johnson – had big days and made key plays.  The Hoosiers had turned a 21–3 deficit late in the 3rd quarter into a 21-16 margin early in the 4th quarter with a chance to take the lead by intercepting Kyle Orton twice.  On the ensuing Hoosier drive after Orton's 2nd interception, LB Landon Johnson picked off Matt Lovecchio to end the IU threat.  Purdue later added a Ben Jones FG, and then ran out the rest of the clock with the help of RB Jerod Void's best game of the season (31 carries, 141 yards).

In defeat, IU (and future Ole Miss and NFL) freshman RB BenJarvus Green-Ellis had a terrific day with 155 yards on the ground, becoming the first RB to gain over 100 yards on Purdue's stout 2003 defense.

Georgia

In a game that mostly reversed the script of their previous meeting in the 2000 Outback Bowl, Purdue and Georgia played a game that featured a big early lead (Georgia 24–0) and a late rally to force overtime (tied at 27).  However, like their 2000 meeting, Georgia emerged as the winner in a truly entertaining 34–27 game.

Needless to say, Purdue had a rough start.  First, as was not typical in 2003, the Purdue defense – which was playing without seniors Jacques Reeves and Gilbert Gardner – got picked apart for the better part of the first half, as Georgia rolled up 24 points and almost 300 yards of offense led by the effective passing of QB David Greene to a talented receiving corps (that included WR Reggie Brown and TE Ben Watson).  Meanwhile, the Purdue offense could not move against the ultra-athletic Georgia defense (30 total yards deep into the 2nd quarter).  Making matters worse, Boilers starting QB Kyle Orton dislocated the thumb on his throwing hand on a David Pollack sack, removing him from the game as Purdue fell further behind.

In an amazing display of toughness and courage, Orton returned after only a few series, sparking the Purdue rally with 10 points late in the 2nd quarter.  First, Orton capped a no-huddle drive with a 20-yard touchdown run to put Purdue on the board.  Then on the first play of the ensuing UGA drive, Purdue forced and recovered a fumble, resulting in a Ben Jones FG.

The third quarter was mostly a field position battle with both defenses firmly in control, keeping the score 24–10.

Early in the fourth quarter, Orton completed passes on 4 consecutive plays to WR Taylor Stubblefield to move Purdue 60 yards to a first and goal situation.  Orton ended the drive with his second touchdown run to make it a one possession game.  But Greene and the Georgia offense responded with an efficient time-consuming drive that ended with a Billy Bennett FG for a 27–17 advantage with less than 5 minutes to go.

But the Boilers were far from finished.  After an exchange of punts, Purdue started a drive with just over 2 minutes left with a terrific 60-yard pass from Orton to WR John Standeford, and then finished it with an Anthony Chambers touchdown catch to make the score 27–24.

Georgia recovered the ensuing onside kick, but then Bulldogs freshman RB Kregg Lumpkin marred an otherwise solid day (over 100 yards rushing) with a critical mistake on a clock-killing run: trying to make a cutback for more yardage, Lumpkin was stripped of the ball from behind by DE Shaun Phillips. Amidst a mad mob of players, LB Niko Koutouvides recovered the fumble at the UGA 35 to give Purdue new life.  Although the Boilermakers could not score a touchdown, they did tie on a clutch 44-yard FG from Ben Jones to send the game to overtime.

Purdue won the OT coin toss and elected to go on defense first.  Helped by a questionable end zone pass interference call, Georgia got a touchdown run from Lumpkin on a 4th and goal from the 1 – a gutsy call by UGA coach Mark Richt.  Then Purdue could not score the necessary touchdown on their OT possession, which ended with an end zone interception on 4th down and goal.

Considering the combination of offense, defense, and special team talent, the 2003 Purdue Boilermakers were arguably Joe Tiller's best overall team in his tenure at Purdue, having concluded a highly successful campaign with a 9–4 record.

2004 NFL Draft

Purdue had 9 NFL Draft picks, just short of the school record of 10 in 1960.

References

Purdue
Purdue Boilermakers football seasons
Purdue Boilermakers football